The North Gaza Governorate is one of the five Governorates of Palestine in the Gaza Strip which is administered by Palestine, aside from its border with Israel, airspace and maritime territory. According to the Palestinian Central Bureau of Statistics, the Governorate had a population of 270,245 (7.2% of the Palestinian population) with 40,262 households in mid-year 2007 encompassing three municipalities, two rural districts and one refugee camp.

It has five seats in the Palestinian Legislative Council, in 2006 they were all won by members of Hamas.

Localities 
 al-Beddawiya
 Beit Hanoun
 Beit Lahia
 Izbat Beit Hanun
 Jabalia

Footnotes

External links
Palestinian website

 
Governorates of the Palestinian National Authority in the Gaza Strip